Magnox is a type of nuclear reactor.

Magnox can also refer to:

Magnox (alloy), an aluminum-magnesium alloy used for fuel cladding in Magnox type reactors
Magnox Ltd, a company that operates Magnox nuclear power stations in the United Kingdom
Magnox, the working title of an early draft of the television series Edge of Darkness